A kantele or kannel is a traditional Finnish and Karelian plucked string instrument (chordophone)  belonging to the south east Baltic box zither family known as the Baltic psaltery along with Estonian kannel, Latvian kokles, Lithuanian kanklės and Russian gusli.

Construction

Small kantele

Modern instruments with 15 or fewer strings are generally more closely modeled on traditional shapes, and form a category of instrument known as small kantele, in contrast to the modern concert kantele.

The oldest forms of kantele have five or six horsehair strings and a wooden body carved from one piece; more modern instruments have metal strings and often a body made from several pieces. The traditional kantele has neither bridge nor nut, the strings run directly from the tuning pegs to a metal bar (varras) set into wooden brackets (ponsi). Though not acoustically efficient, this construction is part of the distinctive sound of the instrument.

The most typical and traditional tuning of the five-string small kantele is just intonation arrived at via five-limit tuning, often in Dmajor or Dminor. This occurs especially if a kantele is played as a solo instrument or as a part of a folk music ensemble. The major triad is then formed by D1–F1–A1. In modern variants of small kantele, there are often semitone levers for some strings. The most typical lever for a five-string kantele is a switch between F1 and F1, which allows most folk music to be played without retuning. Larger versions of the small kantele often have additional semitone levers, allowing a more varied selection of music to be played without retuning.

Concert kantele

A modern concert kantele can have up to 40 strings. The playing positions of the concert kantele and the small kantele are reversed: for a small kantele, the longest, low-pitched strings are farthest away from the musician's body, whilst for a concert kantele this side of the instrument is nearest, and the short, high-pitched strings are the farthest away. Concert versions have a switch mechanism (similar to semitone levers on a modern folk harp) for making sharps and flats, an innovation introduced by Paul Salminen in the 1920s.

Playing

The kantele has a distinctive bell-like sound. The Finnish kantele generally has a diatonic tuning, though small kanteles with between 5 and 15 strings are often tuned to a gapped mode, missing a seventh and with the lowest pitched strings tuned to a fourth below the tonic, as a drone. Players hold the kantele in their laps or on a small table. There are two main playing techniques, either plucking the strings with the fingers or strumming unstopped strings (sometimes with a matchstick). Small kanteles and concert kanteles have different, though related, repertoires.

Music

There have been strong developments for the kantele in Finland since the mid-20th century, starting with the efforts of modern players such as Martti Pokela in the 1950s and 1960s. Education for playing the instrument starts in schools and music institutes up to conservatories and the Sibelius Academy, the only music university in Finland and the site of significant doctoral research into traditional, western classical and electronic music. A Finnish luthiery, Koistinen Kantele, has also developed an electric kantele, employing pickups similar to those on electric guitars, which has gained popularity amongst Finnish heavy metal musicians such as Amorphis. American harpist Sylvan Grey has recorded two albums of Kantele music featuring her own compositions.

Legendary history

In Finland's national epic, Kalevala, the mage Väinämöinen makes the first kantele from the jawbone of a giant pike and a few hairs from Hiisi's stallion (excerpt lyrics). The music it makes draws all the forest creatures near to wonder at its beauty.

Later, after grieving at the loss of his kantele, Väinämöinen makes another one from birch, strung with the hair of a willing maiden, and its magic proves equally profound. It is the gift the eternal mage leaves behind when he departs Kaleva at the advent of Christianity.

See also
Psaltery 
Qanun, plucked string instrument similar to the kantele, originating from ancient Assyria and still widely played in Middle East, Central Asia, North Africa, Caucasus, Turkey, and Ukraine. 
:Category:Kantele players

References

External links 

 The Kantele Traditions of Finland. Carl Rahkonen, PhD ethnomusicology thesis. Indiana University Bloomington, 1989
 Kantele.net 

Baltic psaltery
Finnish musical instruments
National symbols of Finland